Daniel Thomson (born 24 February 1991) is a Scottish footballer who last played for Heart of Midlothian, as a midfielder. He has also played for Clyde and Raith Rovers on loan.

Career

Hearts
A member of the Hearts youth team, Thomson signed a new contract with the club in January 2010. Having yet to make his first team debut for the club, Thomson was loaned to Clyde and Raith Rovers to get first-team experience. On 29 January 2013, he was released by the club, having made no first-team appearances.

Clyde
Thomson went out on loan to Clyde in February 2011 to gain first-team experience until the end of the season, making his debut on 15 February against Berwick Rangers. In all he made five appearances for Clyde.

Raith Rovers
At the start of the 2011–12 season Thomson was once again sent out on loan by Hearts, this time to Scottish First Division team Raith Rovers. He made his debut as a substitute against Cowdenbeath in the Challenge Cup on 23 July 2011. The following week, he scored his first goal for the club, against Montrose in the Scottish League Cup. His last game came on 26 December against Ayr United, and on 5 January 2012 his loan expired and he returned to Hearts.

Career statistics

Personal life
He is the younger brother of fellow footballer Jason Thomson.

References

Living people
1991 births
Heart of Midlothian F.C. players
Clyde F.C. players
Raith Rovers F.C. players
Scottish Football League players
Scottish footballers
Association football midfielders
Scotland youth international footballers
Footballers from Edinburgh